Charles Patrick Keedy (born January 10, 1958, in Birmingham, Alabama) is an American former collegiate and professional baseball player who played for Auburn University and three seasons for the California Angels, Chicago White Sox, and Cleveland Indians of the Major League Baseball (MLB). Keedy is now the Principal at Corner High School in Jefferson County, AL.

References
, or Retrosheet

1958 births
Living people
American expatriate baseball players in Canada
Auburn Tigers baseball players
Auburn University alumni
Baseball players from Birmingham, Alabama
California Angels players
Chicago White Sox players
Cleveland Indians players
Colorado Springs Sky Sox players
Edmonton Trappers players
El Paso Diablos players
Hawaii Islanders players
Holyoke Millers players
Major League Baseball third basemen
Midland Angels players
Salinas Angels players
Tigres de Aragua players
American expatriate baseball players in Venezuela
Tucson Toros players